Acetyleugenol is a phenylpropanoid compound found in cloves. It is the second in abundance to the related compound eugenol in certain extract preparations. Like eugenol, its found in several plants such as Acacia nilotica and Piper betle and has similar antibacterial and antifungal properties on C. albicans and S. mutans. It inhibits aggregation of platelets and has partial agonistic activity on AhR.

Uses 
Acetyleugenol has characteristic odor reminiscent of cloves and thus used as fragrance.

See also 
 Methyleugenol

References 

Phenylpropanoids
Phenylpropenes